This is a list of colleges and universities located in Sargodha, Pakistan.

Colleges and Universities in Sargodha

Schools

Beaconhouse School System
The City School
Lahore Grammar School
Dar-e-Arqam Schools
PAF Public School
Presentation Convent High School
Army Public School
Divisional Public School
Knewton School System

Sanai School System
 Air Base Inter School
 Fazaia Inter School
 Islamic Alta Vista High School
 Lasani Grammar High School
 St. Mary's Boys High School
 St. Doris Girls High School
 Misali Ravian School
 Central Punjab Public High School, Bhagtanwala
 Government Central Model High School
 Government High School, Johar Colony
 Government Model High School No. 1
 Government Model High School No. 2
 Government Comprehensive High School for Boys
 Government Comprehensive High School for Girls
 Government M.C High School for Girls Block no. 26 & 27
 Government High School Chak no. 47
 Government High School Sultanabad
 Government Junior Model Secondary School
 Progressive Public School
 The Right School
 Reader Grammar School
 The Wings Montessori and School
 Fatima Model School, Chak no 110 N.B
 Takbeer Model Public School              Federal govt public school mela mandi road Sargodha

Academies
KIPS Academy

References

 List of Universities in Pakistan

Sargodha
Universities and colleges in Sargodha District